Boucheron may refer to:

Boucheron, a French jewelry company
Boucheron (horse), an American Saddlebred show horse
Boucheron (surname), a French last name